Équateur, French for equator, may refer to:

Places
 Province of Équateur, a province of the Democratic Republic of the Congo since 2015
 Équateur (former province), a former province of the Democratic Republic of the Congo, 1966–2015
 Équateur District, a former district of the former province

Others
 Équateur (film), 1983 French drama film directed by Serge Gainsbourg

See also 
 Equator (disambiguation)